WTYS (1340 AM) is a radio station broadcasting a bluegrass and country music format. Licensed to Marianna, Florida, United States.  The station is currently owned by James L. Adams, Jr.

References

External links

TYS (AM)
Country radio stations in the United States